IPVanish VPN (also known as IPVanish) is a VPN service based in the United States, with applications for Microsoft Windows, macOS, Android, iOS, and Fire TV. Manual configuration is available for ChromeOS, Windows Phone, Linux, and DD-WRT routers.

History 
IPVanish was founded in 2012 by Mudhook Media Inc, an independent subordinate of Highwinds Network Group in Orlando, Florida. 

The VPN service started with 32 servers and a client for Windows operating systems. In later years, software support was expanded to macOS, iOS, Android, and Fire TV. The IPVanish owns and controls a private fiber-optic network of tier-1 servers and owns roughly 90% of its points of presence (POPs), where the company controls the data center and hardware, or "the rack and stack." Its infrastructure is leased from third-party operators in regions "where it doesn’t make sense to have our own gear," such as Albania. 

In 2016, The company suspended operations in Russia due to conflicts with the company's zero-log policy and local law.

In 2017, Highwinds Network Group was acquired by CDN company StackPath which included IPVanish as part of the acquisition.

In 2019, IPVanish was acquired by J2 Global with their NetProtect business.

In July 2020, IPVanish removed its servers from Hong Kong

Controversy 
According to a June 2018 article by TorrentFreak, court documents have shown that IPVanish handed over personal information about a customer to the Department of Homeland Security (HSI) in 2016. The customer was suspected of sharing child pornography on an IRC network. The information, which allowed HSI to identify the customer, consisted of the customer's name, his email address, details of his VPN subscription, his real IP address (Comcast) "as well as dates and times [he] connected to, and disconnected from, the IRC network.” The logging of the customer's IP address and connection timestamps to the IRC service contradicts IPVanish's privacy policy, which states that "[IPVanish] will never log any traffic or usage of our VPN." 

In 2017, IPVanish and its parent company were acquired by StackPath, and its founder and CEO, Lance Crosby, claims that "at the time of the acquisition, [...] no logs existed, no logging systems existed and no previous/current/future intent to save logs existed." The story attracted attention on Reddit, when the court documents were posted on the /r/piracy subreddit.

Uses 
IPVanish funnels the internet traffic of it users through remote servers run by the service, hiding the user's IP address and encrypting data transmitted through the connection. Users can simultaneously connect an unlimited number of devices.

Like other VPN services, IPVanish also has the ability to bypass internet censorship in most countries. By selecting a VPN server in a region outside of their physical position, an IPVanish user can easily access online content which was not available in their location otherwise. IPVanish can be used to play games that are regionally-restricted due to licensing agreements. In their 2017 review of the service, IGN named IPVanish as “one of the best gaming VPNs.” During a speed test of the VPN with League of Legends, the reviewer noted a ping drop of just one millisecond.

Technical details

Features 

IPVanish VPN offers several features, including:

 IPv6 leak protection
 DNS leak protection
 OpenVPN scramble
 SOCKS5 web proxy
 Unlimited bandwidth
 Unlimited P2P
 IP address cycling
 Port forwarding
 Access via UDP/TCP
 Internet kill switch

Encryption 
IPVanish uses the OpenVPN and IKEv2/IPsec technologies in its applications, while the L2TP and PPTP connection protocols can also be configured. IPVanish supports the AES (128-bit or 256-bit) specifications, with SHA-256 for authentication and an RSA-2048 handshake.

Servers 
IPVanish owns and operates more than 1500 remote servers in over 75+ locations. The largest concentration of VPN servers is located in the United States, United Kingdom, and Australia. The company suspended operations in Russia as of July 2016, due to conflicts with the company's zero-log policy and local law. In July 2020, IPVanish removed its servers from Hong Kong, alleging that the Hong Kong national security law puts Hong Kong under the “same tight internet restrictions that govern mainland China.” 

IPVanish is headquarters in the United States, which does not have mandatory data retention laws.

Recognition 

 In 2016, IPVanish was awarded the Silver Award for Startup of the Year from the Info Security PG's Global Excellence Awards and Lifehacker AU rated the service as its #1 VPN. PC Magazine rated IPVanish “excellent” in an April 2017 review, praising its nonrestrictive BitTorrent practices while noting it as one of the more expensive VPNs.

In a 2018 review highlighting IPVanish ‘zero logs’ policies and nonprofit support, CNET ranked IPVanish as one of the best VPN services of the year. The reviewer also noted that its integrated plugin for Kodi, the open-source media streaming app, is unique to the VPN industry. TechRadar rated the service 4 out of 5 stars in their March 2018 review, commending it for its powerful features while criticizing its “lethargic support response”. An annually-updated TorrentFreak article reviewing the logging policies of VPN services lists IPVanish as an anonymous provider. Tom's Guide wrote that the lack of a kill switch on the mobile application "may be a downside for some".

Related media 
In September 2015, the ex-husband of Phillip Morris USA tobacco heiress, Anne Resnick, was accused of hacking his estranged wife’s phone to spy on her during the divorce proceedings. During the deposition, the husband plead the Fifth Amendment 58 times when questioned about bank records indicating subscriptions to mSpy as well as IPVanish.

See also 
 Comparison of virtual private network services
 Internet privacy
 Encryption
 Secure communication

References 

Virtual private network services